Bai Xueshan (born May 1961) is a former Chinese politician. He was the Vice Chairman of Ningxia since 2013. On November 6, 2015, Bai was placed under investigation by the Central Commission for Discipline Inspection. He was the first provincial-ministerial level official being examined from Ningxia after the 18th Party Congress in 2012. In 2017, Bai was sentenced to 15 years in prison for bribery.

Career
Bai Xueshan was born in Wuqi County, Shaanxi in May 1961. His name, "Xueshan", roughly means "snow mountain". In 1984, he was graduated from Central Party School of the Chinese Communist Party and went to work in Yinchuan Suburban Second Construction Company.  He then served successively as the liaison of the Yinchuan government in Shanghai, the governor and party chief of the Suburban District of Yinchuan, the party chief of Helan County, and vice mayor of Yinchuan; and Bai became the mayor of Yinchuan from January 2006 to September 2007.

In 2007 Bai Xueshan was transferred to Wuzhong, another city in Ningxia, to become the Party Secretary of that city.  In Wuzhong, local residents nicknamed him "Bai Luanchai" (literally, "Bai who arbitrarily tears things down"), due to his tendencies to raze various parts of town to make way for new construction.  Since 2013, Bai became the Vice Chairman of Ningxia (since Ningxia is an autonomous region, the Chairman is equivalent of a provincial governor). Bai was said to have been involved in real estate development during his career.

On November 6, 2015, Bai was placed under investigation by the Central Commission for Discipline Inspection of the Chinese Communist Party for "serious violations of regulations". On December 28, Bai was expelled from the party. The investigation concluded that Bai had "shallow sense of the duties of a party member", long took part in "superstitious activities", accepted bribes, and promoted the business interests of his relatives and associates.

On April 28, 2017, Bai was sentenced to 15 years in prison, for taking some 38.87 million yuan (~$6.48 million) in bribes.

References

1961 births
Politicians from Yan'an
Living people
Political office-holders in Ningxia
Chinese Communist Party politicians from Shaanxi
People's Republic of China politicians from Shaanxi
Expelled members of the Chinese Communist Party
Chinese politicians convicted of corruption